An Hòa may refer to several places in Vietnam, including:

An Hòa, Biên Hòa, a ward of Biên Hòa
An Hòa, An Giang, a rural commune in An Giang Province